Lior Asulin (born 6 October 1980) is a male Israeli footballer.

Playing career

Maccabi Herzliya and Ariel Shaiman 
A native of Ra'anana, Israel he grew up in the youth system of Maccabi Herzliya and it was there that he made the jump to Israel's highest league, Israeli Premier League but did not last long as the club was relegated just two seasons after he made the first team. In Liga Leumit Lior scored a league leading twenty-eight goals, so after the 2001–02 season, club chairman Ariel Shaiman loaned Lior out to clubs in the top league and signed him to a long term contract with Herzliya hoping to cash in on a large transfer fee.

During his seasons on loan, Lior has won the State Cup and established himself as one of the top Israeli strikers in the domestic league. Subsequently, after the end of the 2005–06 season, Herzliya chairman Ariel Shaiman disclosed to the media that he received lucrative offers from Olympique de Marseille and OGC Nice from France, from Russia, Turkey, 3 teams from Cyprus, and from a team in Greece for Asulin's services though nothing has ever come about from said offers.

Beitar Jerusalem 
After winning the State Cup with Bnei Sakhnin, Asulin was signed on loan by Beitar Jerusalem.
In June 2007, he signed for a four-year contract with Hapoel Tel Aviv.
In January 2008 after a not so good time in Hapoel with a record of 0 league goal he signed for Apollon Limassol.

From  2009 to 2011 Lior played for Hapoel Be'er Sheva in the Israeli Premier League.

Return to Liga Leumit 

On 17 August 2011 he signed a contract with Hapoel Ramat Gan in Liga Leumit. Asulin helped them win the Leumit double as they won the Toto Cup and the league to secure promotion to the Premier League. He was the club's top scorer in that season, scoring in total 14 goals in all competitions.

On 17 June 2012 after being released by Ramat Gan for poor behavior he signed a new contract with Hapoel Rishon LeZion. On 4 December 2012 he helped the club win their first trophy when he scored a goal and a penalty in the 2012–13 Toto Cup Leumit finals.

Honours
 Toto Cup (Leumit)
 2011, 2012
 Liga Leumit
 2011-12

Footnotes

External links

1980 births
Living people
Israeli Jews
Israeli footballers
Maccabi Herzliya F.C. players
Maccabi Petah Tikva F.C. players
Bnei Sakhnin F.C. players
Beitar Jerusalem F.C. players
Bnei Yehuda Tel Aviv F.C. players
Hapoel Tel Aviv F.C. players
Apollon Limassol FC players
Hapoel Be'er Sheva F.C. players
Hapoel Ramat Gan F.C. players
Hapoel Rishon LeZion F.C. players
Hapoel Petah Tikva F.C. players
Hapoel Ashkelon F.C. players
Hapoel Marmorek F.C. players
Hapoel Nof HaGalil F.C. players
Israeli expatriate footballers
Expatriate footballers in Cyprus
Israeli expatriate sportspeople in Cyprus
Israeli Premier League players
Liga Leumit players
Cypriot First Division players
Israeli people of Moroccan-Jewish descent
Footballers from Ra'anana
Association football forwards